Plana may refer to:

 plural of Latin word Planum used in planetary geology

People
 Giovanni Antonio Amedeo Plana (1781–1864) was an Italian astronomer and mathematician
 Plana (crater), named after the astronomer, is a crater on the Moon
Israel Hernandez Plana (born 1970), Cuban judoka
Jaume Vallcorba Plana (1949–2014), Spanish philologist and publisher
Josefina Tanganelli Plana (1904–1966), Catalan cartoonist and painter
 Tony Plana (born 1952), a Cuban-American actor

Places
Antarctica
Plana Peak, on Livingston Island in the South Shetland Islands, Antarctica

Bahamas
Plana Cays, two small islands in the southern Bahama Islands

Bosnia and Herzegovina
Plana, Bileća, village in the municipality of Bileća, Republika Srpska, Bosnia and Herzegovina

Bulgaria
 Plana Mountain in western Bulgaria
 Plana, Bulgaria, small village, situated along the Plana mountain ridge

Czech Republic
Planá (České Budějovice District), village in the South Bohemian Region of the Czech Republic
Plana (Tachov District), town in the Plzeň Region of the Czech Republic
Plana nad Luznici, town in the South Bohemian Region, Czech Republic

Montenegro
Plana, Kolašin, village in the municipality of Kolašin, Montenegro

Serbia
Plana (Kraljevo), village in the municipality of Kraljevo, Serbia
Plana (Paraćin), village in the municipality of Paraćin, Serbia
Plana (Sjenica), village in the municipality of Sjenica, Serbia
Velika Plana, town and municipality in the Podunavlje District, Serbia 
 Velika Plana (Prokuplje), village in the municipality of Prokuplje, Serbia

Spain
Plana Alta, comarca in the province of Castellón, Valencian Community, Spain
Plana Baixa, comarca in the province of Castellón, Valencian Community, Spain
Plana d'Utiel, comarca currently in the province of Valencia, Valencian Community, Spain

United States
Plana,  South Dakota, former village

Other
 Abel–Plana formula, a summation formula in mathematics
 Synemon plana,  commonly known as the golden sun moth, a diurnal moth native to Australia
 Ecklonia kurome f. plana, a brown alga subspecies found in the Sea of Japan